A36 steel is a common structural steel alloy utilized in the United States. The A36 (UNS K02600) standard was established by the ASTM International.  The standard was published in 1960 and has been updated several times since.  Prior to 1960, the dominant standards for structural steel in North America were A7 (until 1967) and A9 (for buildings, until 1940).  Note that SAE/AISI A7 and A9 tool steels are not the same as the obsolete ASTM A7 and A9 structural steels.

Chemical composition 

Note: For shapes with a flange thickness more than 3 in (76 mm), 0.85-1.35% manganese content and 0.15-0.40% silicon content are required.

Properties 
Young's modulus for A36 steel is 200 GPa.

Fabricated forms 
A36 is produced in a wide variety of forms, including:
 Plates
 Structural Shapes
 Bars
 Girders
 Angle iron
 T iron

Methods of joining 
A36 is readily welded by all welding processes. As a result, the most common welding methods for A36 are the cheapest and easiest: shielded metal arc welding (SMAW, or stick welding), gas metal arc welding (GMAW, or MIG welding), and oxyacetylene welding. A36 steel is also commonly bolted and riveted in structural applications. High-strength bolts have largely replaced structural steel rivets. Indeed, the latest steel construction specifications published by AISC (the 15th Edition) no longer covers their installation.

See also 
 Structural steel

References 

Steels
Structural steel